RAPM may refer to

Russian Association of Proletarian Musicians, a former association of Soviet musicians
RAPM, the advanced form of Raven's Progressive Matrices, a non-verbal intelligence test
RAPM, refer to the MM ratio (or M-square ratio), a measure of portfolio performance.